Peter Mills (October 26, 1861 – September 22, 1972) was the last known surviving American born into legal slavery when he died in 1972 at age 110.

Mills was born in Prince George's County, Maryland on October 26, 1861.  After the Civil War, he worked on his father's farm every day during the week before leaving to work in Baltimore and Washington, DC where he dug sewers and played baseball in his spare time. Mills eventually moved to Pittsburgh after first visiting in 1881. Mills died after a pedestrian accident in Pittsburgh, Pennsylvania on September 22, 1972.

See also
 List of last survivors of American slavery

References

19th-century American slaves
1861 births
1972 deaths
Longevity claims
People from Pittsburgh
People from Prince George's County, Maryland
American supercentenarians
Men supercentenarians
Accidental deaths in Pennsylvania
20th-century African-American people